"Fick Feeling" is a song by Swedish duo Samir & Viktor. The song was released in Sweden as a digital download on 25 May 2016. The song peaked at number 11 on the Swedish Singles Chart.

Charts

Release history

References

2016 songs
2016 singles
Samir & Viktor songs
Swedish-language songs
Warner Music Group singles
Songs written by Anton Hård af Segerstad